Jean Acosta Soares (born 27 January 1992) is a Brazilian professional footballer who last played in Brazil for Nova Prata, as a midfielder.

External links

 Voetbal International
Jean Acosta Soares at ZeroZero

1992 births
Living people
Brazilian footballers
Brazilian expatriate footballers
Expatriate footballers in Belgium
Beerschot A.C. players
Belgian Pro League players
Association football midfielders